Donna Taberer is a British television producer and former head of entertainment at Channel 5.

Early life
She was born in East Sussex. She attended grammar school in East Sussex.

Career
She began as a journalist at the age of 18, and trained on the NCTJ course.

BBC
She joined the BBC in 1990 as a researcher on That's Life!. She worked in factual programmes and factual entertainment as an executive producer. She oversaw the Children's Party at the Palace in 2006.

She rejoined the BBC in September 2010.

BSkyB
From 2006 to 2009 she was in charge of commissioning entertainment on Sky 1, Sky 2 and Sky 3.

Five
In August 2009 she joined Five as their head of Entertainment, where she stayed for a year.

BBC Academy
In September 2010, Taberer joined the BBC Academy where she is head of public service partnerships; the Academy includes, among other initiatives, a media training program for journalists and other experts aimed at helping to achieve gender parity on television.

See also
 Richard Woolfe, former Channel control of Five from 2009

References

1964 births
BBC television producers
British women journalists
Channel 5 (British TV channel)
People from East Sussex
Sky Group
Living people
British women television producers